MachTen is a Unix-like operating system from Tenon Intersystems. It is based on 4.4BSD and the Mach kernel, and features the X Window System and GNU programming tools. It runs only as a classic Mac OS application program (in a virtual machine) on Macintosh computers.

MachTen development started in 1989, culminating in the first release in 1991. The Professional MachTen branch, intended for Motorola 68000-based Macintoshes, ended with release 2.3. The Power MachTen branch, which is Power Macintosh compatible, lacks some of the features of Professional MachTen (including true virtual and protected memory models), but takes full advantage of the PowerPC processor and is compatible with Mac OS 9 through its final version, 4.1.4. MachTen is no longer developed, and is functionally superseded by macOS.

See also 
 A/UX
 MacMach
 macOS
 NeXTSTEP

External links 
 
 Floodgap's Power MachTen Hacking Page

Berkeley Software Distribution
Mach (kernel)
Microkernel-based operating systems
Microkernels
Unix emulators